Mahindra Centuro is a 110cc Motorcycle manufactured in India by Mahindra Two Wheelers.
The Centuro gets a remote lock with a flip key, the remote lock uses a 96-bit secure access just like four wheelers. The Centuro has already created a buzz in the market with its design and features and is likely to give leaders Hero MotoCorp, Bajaj, TVS and Honda some serious competition. The bike has been designed and developed from the ground-up at their R&D facility in Pune, in view of demands and much criticism received from thousands of customers in the segment.

Unveiling the new bike, Mahindra Group Chairman Anand Mahindra said the company's success in the two-wheeler territory had disproved sceptics who had advised him against venturing into the segment.

Engine
               
Under the tank of the Centuro, there is an indigenously developed, 106.7-cc, MCi-5 (Micro Chip Ignited-5 Curve) single-cylinder, air-cooled four-stroke motor developing 8.4PS and a four-speed transmission. The bike has a five-step rear suspension to provide greater riding comfort on Indian roads. It produces 8.5 bhp at 8500 rpm and a maximum torque of 8.5 Nm at 5500 rpm. It has a four-speed manual transmission and can zoom to 60 kmph from rest in 8.9 seconds.

Anti-theft key

A striking feature of the Mahindra Centuro is a Central Locking Anti-Theft System with Engine Immobiliser and multifunctional (car-like) flip key with 96-bit encryption, something that is first not just in the segment but a first for all motorcycles made in India.

This encryption key invented by Mr. Anik Majumdar. He is a young genius from Konnagar, District : Hooghly, West Bengal, India. He invented many things in his home laboratory, named Holuni.

Find-me lamp

The bike key can be used to start follow-me-home lights that stay on for while after the key is removed from the ignition, flashing lights with an alarm that aids locating the motorcycle in crowded parking lots, and a LED torch on the key to help find the ignition slot when in a poorly lit area.

Fully lit digital dashboard

The bike sports an advanced, fully lit digital dashboard which is divided into three parts. The left part hosts the DTE and the fuel gauge. The middle has a big-font digital speedometer with one indicator each for service due and for economy mode. The right toggles between a trip meter, odometer and a clock. It is an unusually comprehensive feature set for an entry-level motorcycle where most bikes offer little more than a speedo, fuel gauge and the idiot lights.

Mileage

Mahindra claims an ARAI certified fuel-efficiency of 75 kmpl and the bike comes with a five-year warranty.

References

External links
 

Motorcycles of India
Motorcycles introduced in 2013